Teishebaini (also Teshebani, modern Karmir Blur referring more to the hill that the fortress is located upon) was the capital of the Transcaucasian provinces of the ancient kingdom of Urartu. It is located near the modern city of Yerevan in Armenia. The site was once a fortress and governmental centre with towered and buttressed perimeter walls, massive gates, a parade ground within its walls, and storage rooms that entirely occupied the ground floor. The name Karmir Blur translates to "Red Hill" because of the hill's reddish hue. It became this color after the city was set on fire and the upper walls which were made of tuff fell and crumbled because of the heat. After the tuff was heated by the fire, it took on a more intense red color and therefore the hill became red. The lower portions of the walls were left standing after the fire since they were built with a stronger stone.

History 
The city of Teishebaini was built by Rusa II in mid-7th century BC to protect the eastern borders of Urartu from the barbaric Cimmerians and Scythians. The palace was made of stone, with timber ceilings, and timber columns that supported the roof. The construction of the city, palace, and the citadel were not fully finished until the reign of Rusa III, some 50 years later.

Agriculture was essential to the city, as was raising livestock. The Urartians built massive water canals, some of which are still in use to this day. Archaeological excavations have shown that lentils, hemp, peas, sesame, wheat, and barley were some of the grains that were grown in the area, as well as grapes and plums. The grape seeds that had been found were examined further and it revealed that twelve varieties of grape were grown in the surrounding area of Teishebaini during this time. All of these ancient varieties and more are still grown to this day in modern Armenia. Smaller ceramic vessels were also found in excavations and are known to have been used in brewing beer made from barley. Other much larger vessels were used for storing foods and wine. Small circular markings on the sides of the containers near the top indicated the amount that could be stored inside. The vessels were usually buried half-way into the soil which naturally kept foods cool.

The site was discovered in 1939 after being buried for more than two and a half millennia. A cuneiform inscription had been found three years earlier that led to the discovery of the ancient city.  It read, 'Rusa Argishti-hini' which translates to "Rusa, son of Argishti" also known as Rusa II. Another set of cuneiform inscriptions were found written upon a bronze belt and bronze bolt, both bearing the words "Rusa Argishti, fortress of the city of Teishebaini." The inscriptions helped date the site and tell who its builder was. In 1941 an ivory statuette of the god Teisheba was found within the citadel. The excavations here are considered one of the most important archaeological discoveries and findings in the Middle East, the Near East  and  Asia Minor. Some of the findings include carved ivory, stone, ceramics, metal figurines, pottery and an astonishing wide variety of bronze domestic tools and utensils, military equipment  decorated with mythological symbols, forms and animals, daggers, swords, helmets, arrows, quivers, shields of an advanced metallurgy, as well as vases, bracelets, earrings and medallions in gold and varied sets of other jewelry. Pottery found in the site was either painted black or had painted designs such as waves of water.

Archaeological evidence shows that the city of Teishebaini was destroyed by fire sometime around the beginning of the 6th century BC. Numerous fragments of cloth, rope, and other items such as seeds have been found charred from the city's destruction. It is thought that Teishebaini was attacked during the night since numerous human remains have been found, and rooms within the buildings still had everything in them as if the people living within the city's walls had no chance to flee. During the excavations, skeletons were found holding objects of gold in their hands. It is theorized that when the city was set on fire, that residents of the city began either to loot or save their own possessions from the burning buildings as the city was under attack.

Gallery

Notes

References

 
 
 

Archaeological sites in Armenia
Castles in Armenia
Forts in Armenia
Tourist attractions in Yerevan
Urartian cities
Buildings and structures in Yerevan